Mortlake Anglian & Alpha Boat Club (MAABC) is a rowing club based on the River Thames, close to Chiswick Bridge in Chiswick, West London and has produced multiple national champions.

Location
The MAABC boathouse is situated next door to the Quintin Boat Club which itself is part of the University of Westminster Boathouse and is undergoing refurbishment due to finish in 2022.

History
Although established in 1984 it has much older roots which features a series of mergers from eight clubs. In 1877 the Mortlake Rowing Club was founded and the following year the Anglian Boat Club was founded, these two clubs merged in 1962 to form the Mortlake Anglian Boat Club.

Two clubs called the Bedford Park Rowing Club and the Barnes Bridge & District Rowing Club merged to form the Chiswick Rowing Club and they later merged with the 1962 Mortlake Anglian Boat Club becoming the Mortlake Anglian & Chiswick Boat Club. Finally in 1984 the Alpha Women's Boat Club (which was formed in 1927) merged with the Mortlake Anglian & Chiswick Boat Club to become the Mortlake Anglian & Alpha Boat Club.

Honours

British champions

See also 
Rowing on the River Thames

References 

Tideway Rowing clubs
Rowing clubs in England
Sports clubs established in 1984
1984 establishments in England
Chiswick
Buildings and structures in Chiswick
Rowing clubs of the River Thames